Nonongo is a village and seat of the rural commune of Kamiandougou in the Cercle of Ségou in the Ségou Region of southern-central Mali. It lies 94 km east-northeast of Ségou, the chef-lieu of the cercle.

References

Populated places in Ségou Region